Susan Headley (born 1959, also known as Susy Thunder or Susan Thunder) was a phreaker and early computer hacker during the late 1970s and early 1980s. A member of the so-called Cyberpunks, Headley specialized in social engineering, a type of hacking which uses pretexting and misrepresentation of oneself in contact with targeted organizations in order to elicit information vital to hacking those organizations.

Biography 
Born in Altona, Illinois in 1959, Headley claims to have dropped out of school in the eighth grade after a difficult childhood. She later moved to Los Angeles, California where she worked as a teenage prostitute and was a rock 'n' roll groupie, claiming all four former members of the Beatles among her conquests.  She met computer hacker Kevin Mitnick (also known as Condor) in 1980, and together with another hacker, Lewis de Payne (also known as Roscoe), formed a gang of phone phreaks. In The Hacker's Handbook, Headley is referred to as "one of the earliest of the present generation of hackers" and described as successfully hacking the US phone system as a 17-year-old in 1977.

On October 25, 1983, Headley testified in front of the Governmental Affairs oversight committee as to the technical capabilities and possible motivations of modern-day hackers and phone phreaks.

Public service 
Headley was elected to public office in California in 1994, as City Clerk of California City.

Personal life 
Headley is married, and lives in the Midwest. She is a coin collector.

References

External links 
 Esquire magazine article on Mitnick, including interview with Susan Thunder
 Cyberpunks: Outlaws and Hackers on the Computer Frontier Book by Katie Hafner
 Hendon Mob poker players' database entry for Susy Thunder

Living people
1959 births
American computer criminals
California City, California